{{Infobox ballet|italic title=Sweeney Todd|premiere=10 December 1959|genre=Horror|ballet_company=Royal Ballet|characters=|based_on=The String of Pearls|designer=Alix Stone|choreographer=John Cranko|composer=Malcolm Arnold|setting=Fleet Street, London}}

The ballet Sweeney Todd, Op. 68 by Malcolm Arnold was completed in 1959. It is a one-act ballet based on the legend of Sweeney Todd, a villain in The String of Pearls'' serial. The scenario and original choreography were by John Cranko and the scenery and costumes by Alix Stone in the style of Victorian toy theatres. It was first performed by the Royal Ballet touring company on 10 December 1959, at the Shakespeare Memorial Theatre, Stratford-upon-Avon, with the Royal Opera House Orchestra conducted by John Lanchbery. The dancers who created the roles in the first production were Donald Britton (Sweeney Todd), Johaar Mosaval (Tobias), Elizabeth Anderton (Johanna), Desmond Doyle (Mark Ingestre), Ian Hamilton (Colonel Jeffrey).

Concert suites
In 1984, the composer David Ellis compiled a 20-minute concert suite, Op. 68a from the ballet in collaboration with the composer. The suite was first performed on 19 June 1990 at Bristol University with the University Chamber Orchestra. A shortened version of the suite was arranged for brass band by Phillip Littlemore. It had its first performance on  22 October 2006 at the Malcolm Arnold Festival, Derngate in Northampton by the Rushden Windmill Band led by Richard Graves.

References

External links
Ballet from Malcolm Arnold's official website
Faber Music page on the ballet
Ballet suite from Malcolm Arnold's Official Site
Faber Music page on the suite
Brass band version of the suite

Ballets by John Cranko
1959 ballet premieres
Ballets by Malcolm Arnold
1959 compositions
Orchestral suites
Sweeney Todd